Violella is a genus of two species of crustose lichens in the family Tephromelataceae. The genus is characterized by its brownish inner ascospore walls, brilliant violet hymenial pigment (called Fucatus-violet), and thallus chemistry. The type species, Violella fucata, was originally placed in genus Mycoblastus, but molecular phylogenetic analysis showed that this species as well as the Asian species V. wangii formed a phylogenetically distinct clade and warranted placement in a new genus. The generic name Violella, a diminutive form of the Latin viola, refers to the characteristic hymenium colour.

References

Lecanorales genera
Lecanorales
Lichen genera
Taxa described in 2011
Taxa named by Toby Spribille